The coppery brushtail possum (Trichosurus johnstonii) is a species of marsupial possum in the family Phalangeridae. Coppery brushtails are found within the Atherton Tablelands area of Queensland, in northeastern Australia. These mammals inhabit rainforest ecosystems, living within the tree canopy. Though they have a restricted distribution, they are locally common. This population is often considered a subspecies of T. vulpecula.

Description
Coppery brushtail possums have a typical length of 400-490 mmm and weigh 1200-1800 g, with males being larger and heavier than females.

Ecology
Like the common brushtail possum, coppery brushtails are nocturnal, and live in dens, which are usually tree hollows. At night, they still spend half of their time resting to conserve energy, and the other half in foraging. In feeding experiments, in selecting their food, these possums may tend to select a mix of plant materials with detoxification requirements that are correlated or independent, rather than contradictory, thus maximizing their ability to process harmful plant byproducts.

Dominance among individuals tends to place females above males, and larger over smaller individuals.

References

Possums
Mammals of Queensland
Marsupials of Australia
Mammals described in 1888
Taxobox binomials not recognized by IUCN